The 2022 Pan American Cross Country Cup took place on March 27, 2022, in Serra, Brazil.

Medalists

Race results

Senior men's race (10 km)

Senior women's race (10 km)

Medal table (unofficial)

Note: Totals include both individual and team medals, with medals in the team competition counting as one medal.

Participation
According to an unofficial count,  athletes from 44 countries participated.

 (0)
 (0)
 (0)
 (0)
 (0)
 (0)
 (0)
 (0)
 (0)
 (12)
 (0)
 (12)
 (0)
 (0)
 (0)
 (0)
 (0)
 (0)
 (0)
 (0)
 (0)
 (0)
 (0)
 (0)
 (0)
 (0)
 (0)
 (7)
 (0)
 (0)
 (0)
 (0)
 (6)
 (0)
 (0)
 (0)
 (0)
 (0)
 (0)
 (0)
 (0)
 (0)
 (2)
 (0)

See also
 2022 in athletics (track and field)
 results World Athletics

References

Pan American Cross Country Cup
Pan American Cross Country Cup
Pan American Cross Country Cup
Pan American Cross Country Cup
Pan American Cross Country Cup